Rach Gia Airport  is an airport located in Rach Gia, Vietnam. The airport was built in the 1950s by the French. Its original purpose was to connect Saigon to the Southwestern portion of Vietnam.

Airlines and destinations

See also 

 List of airports in Vietnam

References

Airports in Vietnam
Buildings and structures in Kiên Giang province